Song in the Clouds, also known as Yun Zhongge, is a novel by Tong Hua. It was published in 2007 by Writers Publishing House (作家出版社). It is a sequel to Ballad of the Desert.

Plot

During the Western Han Dynasty, Huo Yunge (daughter of Huo Qubing and Jin Yu from Ballad of the Desert) saved the eight-year-old Emperor Zhao of Han from the cold of the desert. Ten years later, Huo is a beautiful young woman who could not forget that boy and went to Chang An city to fulfil their 10 years ago promise. She mistook another Liu Bing Yi as Emperor Liu Fu Ling as both of them had a similar jade given by the late emperor and helplessly watched him marry Xu Pingjun.

References 

2007 Chinese novels
Historical romance novels
Interracial romance novels
Novels set in the Western Han
Novels by Tong Hua (writer)
Sequel novels
Chinese novels adapted into television series